Basque may refer to:

 Basques, an ethnic group of Spain and France
 Basque language, their language

Places
 Basque Country (greater region), the homeland of the Basque people with parts in both Spain and France
 Basque Country (autonomous community), an autonomous region of Spain
 Northern Basque Country, in the western part of the Pyrénées-Atlantiques of France
 Southern Basque Country, both the Basque Autonomous Community and Navarre

Other uses
 Basque (clothing), or old basque, an item of women's apparel
 Basque (grape), a white wine grape

See also

 Basque cuisine, the cuisine of the Basque people
 Basque music, the music of the Basque people
 Basque conflict
 List of people from the Basque Country
 Port aux Basques (Port Basque), Newfoundland, Newfoundland and Labrador, Canada; a town district
 
 
 Bask (disambiguation)
 BASC (disambiguation)

Language and nationality disambiguation pages